Shenzhen Middle School, commonly referred as SMS or SZMS, is a high school located in Luohu District, Shenzhen, Guangdong, China. Founded in 1947, it was made the only provincial key high school (magnet school) in Shenzhen in 1983. In November 1993, it became one of the first Class-One Schools of Guangdong Province. In 1998, Shenzhen Middle School merged with Honghu Middle School, and the latter's campus is now Shenzhen Middle School's junior school. The student-teacher ratio is about 10:1. Zhu Huawei (朱华伟, Zhū Huáwěi) is the current principal.

Shenzhen Middle School has been continuously ranked as the best school in Shenzhen and among the top schools in Guangdong Province. Over the last two years, Shenzhen Middle School has been ranked #1 in the percentage and number of high-scoring students in Guangdong Province, with the largest number of graduates admitted by top Chinese universities every year. In a 2016 ranking of Chinese high schools that send students to study in US universities, Shenzhen Middle School ranked number 8 in mainland China in terms of the number of students entering top American universities.

Shenzhen Middle School consists of primary, junior and senior schools, located on separate campuses. The senior campus is divided into East Campus, where 10th and 11th graders are located, and West Campus, where 12th graders under intensive preparations for National Higher Education Entrance Examination are located.

In the three campuses, only the senior campus offers student dorms, which allows Shenzhen Middle School students to choose whether they want to be commuters or residents on campus. The residential facilities available include two residential halls, two dining halls, and two grocery stores. Both junior and senior campuses have a soccer field and a track field. There are five basketball courts, including one indoor, badminton courts and table tennis tables, a taekwondo room and a dancing room.

History 

In 1947, the Zhang family in Shuibei, Xiangxi, along with the Hubei Villages in Baoan County, Guangdong Province, raised the funds to establish a junior high school. Four people were elected by every village to form a board of directors which files the application to the Baoan County government. In July 1948, Guangdong Province Department of Education granted the registration of the school. In September 1948, Shenzhen Junior High School officially started. It was located on 10 Yangsheng St Alley 4 near the old county hall. In November 1949 after the establishment of The People's Republic of China, Baoan County People's Government took over Shenzhen Junior High School, and changed its name to the Baoan County Second Junior High School. At that time, the school's facility contained a two-story building, an auditorium downstairs, and a patio. In September 1955, Baoan County Second Junior High School changed its name to Baoan Middle School and became a key middle school in Baoan county. In the same year, it started its high school division. In June 1983, after the authorization of Guangdong Provincial government, Shenzhen Middle School became the Provincial Key High School of Guangdong Province. Honghu Middle School was then merged in Shenzhen Middle School on June 22, 1998.

In 2002, Wang Zheng, the Vice President of the Affiliated High School of Peking University and the President of its division in Nanshan, Shenzhen was assigned the presidency of Shenzhen Middle School. The same year, Shenzhen Middle School started its exploration of educational and curricular reform. Starting from September 2003, Shenzhen Middle School attempted to separate instructive classes and form classes, and canceled its form class system and form instructor system, replacing them with a tutorial system. Students' rights and autonomy were also greatly enhanced. The Student Union was defined as a student self-governance organization. At its peak, more than a third of the student body were members of the Student Union.

The reforms instituted by Wang Zheng caused widespread controversies. Some teachers criticized that his reform irresponsibly allowed for too much space for the students; some parents thought that the reform measures negatively influenced students' performance in the National Higher Education Entrance Examination. On the other hand, some of the graduates thought that the educational model after the reform made them realize their rights and responsibilities as citizens, and was their enlightenment of civic awareness as a member of the civil society. The educational industry and society have also seen Wang's reform as an experiment with civic education.

In April 2010, Wang returned to the Affiliated High School of Peking University to serve as its President. The same year, Wang Zhanbao took over as the new president of Shenzhen Middle School. After assuming his post, he instituted a series of reforms under the slogan "Strive for Academic Excellence. Cultivate a Creative Student Body." He restored the form instructor and form class systems and reduced the number of courses requiring students to go to different classrooms. Initially, his reforms are criticized as "the revival of examination-only education". Meanwhile, Shenzhen Middle School's national key universities admissions rate in Gaokao increased.

On February 19, 2016, because of health concerns, Wang Zhanbao resigned from the post of the President. The President of Shenzhen Second Experimental School, Zhao Li, took the post of the presidency.

On January 17, 2017, because Zhao Li was appointed the Vice-Director of Shenzhen Department of Education in November 2016, Zhu Huawei, former Dean of Guangzhou Education Research Institute, became Shenzhen Middle School's President.

On October 21, 2017, a fire occurred on the second floor of the West Campus Dining Hall. Student-run media Nirvana News reported on the news of the fire. It's said that after the event, some administrators pressured the parents of the editors of the Nirvana News, demanding the deletion of the report. The event led to widespread attention and discussion among Shenzhen Middle School's students and alumni.

Curriculum 
Shenzhen Middle School offers four curricula to high school students and one curriculum to middle school students. High school students submit their curriculum preferences before the start of their freshman year. All curricula require entrance exams except the Standard Curriculum. For the school year of 2011-2012, the Experimental Curriculum and the Honor Curriculum required a written entrance exam, and the International Curriculum required both a written entrance exam and an interview. Students who do not submit any preference or students who indicate their preferences to these three curricula but fail to pass their written exams and/or interviews are automatically admitted by the Standard Curriculum.

Standard Curriculum 
The Standard Curriculum prepares high school students specifically for the National Higher Education Entrance Examination, a prerequisite for entrance into underground-level education institutions in the form of academic examinations. The Standard Curriculum comprises about 40% of students in Shenzhen Middle School.

Experimental Curriculum 
The Experimental Curriculum, with two concentrations, provides students with specialized courses that are normally not available to high school students in China. The Experimental Curriculum comprises about 30% of students in SMS.

"Gaokao" Concentration 
The "Gaokao" Concentration of the Experimental Curriculum is a program designed for students who are interested in both participating in the National Higher Education Entrance Examination (the Gaokao), and exploring different courses and pedagogical options offered by SMS's Experimental Curriculum.

International Concentration (Previously the International Curriculum) 
The International Concentration of the Experimental Curriculum, or the Advanced Placement Program (APP), is a program for students who plan to study abroad, usually in the United States. Students in this concentration comprise about 18% percent of students in Shenzhen Middle School. Previously called the International Curriculum (commonly referred to as IC), this concentration was renamed and placed under the administration of the Experimental Curriculum in the 2016-2017 school year.

This curriculum is distinguished by offering a liberal arts and science curriculum that emphasizes critical thinking and creativity. Such courses are usually taught in English by Western instructors and are taught at collegiate level rigor. In the 2013-2014 school year, over 30 college-level courses are offered in addition to college prep courses, including courses in the English language arts, the humanities and social sciences, art, and drama along with math and hard sciences. By taking these courses, students have an extremely high practical level of English in thinking, expression and social interaction. The IC also has a certified college counselor on staff to ensure compliance with US policies and procedures for college application and admission.

In addition, starting from the 2020-2021 school year, the International Concentration began offering the A-Level Program, designed to better prepare students for admission into top UK universities. This program is a response to the increasing demand of students who are more willing to pursue higher education in the UK because of its shorter course (3 years in England instead of 4 years in the US), more affordable tuition, and deterred by the unstable Sino-US relationship under Trump administration. Previously, students could, and still can, apply to UK universities using US standardized test scores, such as SAT, ACT, TOEFL, AP, etc., but due to the differences between the US and UK education system, the results have not been excellent. The effectiveness of the A-Level Program remains to be seen, as it has yet to graduate it first class of students, which is due in 2023.

There has been a misconception that students in IC are required to pay a higher tuition fee than other students in Shenzhen Middle School. Admittedly, IC students occasionally need to buy foreign textbooks, which are more expensive in most cases. Nevertheless, the tuition they pay is the same as that paid by any other students in Shenzhen Middle School and in any public high school in Shenzhen.

Honor Curriculum 
The Honor Curriculum is distinguished by students participation in Olympiad academic contests on subjects including mathematics, physics, chemistry, biology, and informatics. The Honor Curriculum comprises about 20% of students in SMS.

Since the Honor Curriculum was established, students have won many provincial, national and international academic awards and honors. Each year, some outstanding Honor Curriculum students are directly admitted by universities in China without taking the National Higher Education Entrance Examination.  Some other excellent students may be qualified to receive "score plus" in the National Higher Education Entrance Examination and are therefore able to be admitted into any universities with scores lower than that normally required.

The school year of 2011-12 saw a major change in the Honor Curriculum.  A new class was established to host students who demonstrate an excellent command of languages, humanities, or social sciences.  Newly enrolled students take an entrance exam to be admitted into this class.

Integral Curriculum 
The Integral Curriculum, also called 3+2, is an unofficial course curriculum distinguished by including both junior and senior high school students. The students who enroll in this curriculum in 7th grade are ensured to enter the high school of Shenzhen Middle School.

The Integral Curriculum provides the students with advanced courses in senior high school, including mathematics, physics, and chemistry competition. It is where gifted students start their academic careers.

Student Achievements

Academic Competitions 
Starting from the 1990s, Shenzhen Middle School began encouraging students to participate in various academic competitions, including math, physics, chemistry, biology, computer science, astronomy, and other subjects. After Wang Zheng became the school president, he supported student participation of those academic contests and recruited instructors to provide instruction. After that, almost every year, there are students from Shenzhen Middle School to represent China in international academic competitions. After Wang Zhanbao became the President, he set up the Honor Curriculum, standardized and incorporated the training for International Olympiads into Shenzhen Middle School's elective curriculum, and granted credits for students participating in those competitions according to "Shenzhen Middle School High-end Academic Activities Management Regulations."

Every year, over 10 students from Shenzhen Middle School are granted prioritized admissions by Peking University, Tsinghua University, and University of Science and Technology of China.

Campus media

Radio Station 
The radio station named Fenghuazijin is an official on-campus broadcast station of Shenzhen Middle School. It mainly broadcasts news, literature, music, and critiques written by members of the radio station, with over two thousand listeners.

Nova Monthly 
Nova Monthly is a bilingual school magazine published monthly in English and Chinese. It focuses on translating thought-provoking articles in American and English publications into Chinese. As a cultural ambassador, it aims to highlight the wisdom and sparkling ideas of oversea countries and build a bridge connecting the West and East. Nova Monthly contains 5 interdisciplinary columns: "Living", "Sports", "Entertainment", "Technology," and "Column X".

Nirvana News 
Nirvana News is an independent campus news outlet established and run exclusively by students. It reports on various campus events, and aims to provide an impartial and objective portrait of campus affairs in Shenzhen Middle School.

Nirvana News has emerged from Nirvana Weekly, which was a comprehensive Chinese magazine first published by Shenzhen Middle School students in November 2009. Being an unaffiliated and non-profit magazine, Nirvana Weekly aimed to deliver intramural and extramural information with fine quality, spread contemporary citizen ideals, and solicit consideration and discussion among its readers. The magazine's motto was "Through the darkest dark, may we see the light. (越万里之溟濛兮，见凤之流光)"  In a report published in June 2011, it was dubbed the most daring publication in China, and that most of the mainstream publications couldn't match its outspokenness.

Visionary Monthly 
Visionary Monthly is an English-only school magazine. It is the first English-only media within Shenzhen Middle School, which is completely written, edited, and published by middle school students in SMS. Its influence spreads beyond campus, as it has buyers all over Shenzhen and more than three hundred subscriptions. Most of the articles in the magazine are novels, proses, music criticism, and political criticism.

Shenzhong Daily 
Shenzhong Daily is a daily on-campus newspaper publication. It began its publications in 2009, and is free to all the faculty and students of Shenzhen Middle School.

Clubs 
There are more than 70 clubs in Shenzhen Middle School.

Shenzhen Middle School Student Activity Association 
Shenzhen Middle School Student Activity Association is a student-run organization aimed towards organizing high-quality student activities and providing technical support for routine activities in the school. Its biggest activities include the Shenzhen Middle School's Top Ten Singers Competition, and the annual New Year Fete.

Shenzhen Middle School Model United Nations 
Shenzhen Middle School Model United Nations is the organizer of Pan-Pearl River Delta Model United Nation Conference For High School Students (PPRDMUN), the largest and most weighty MUN conference in Southern China.

Shenzhen Middle School Science Association 
Shenzhen Middle School Science Association is a club where students communicate with others on scientific issues. There're five academic divisions so far - the Mathematics, Physics, Chemistry, Biology, and Computer Science.

The Shenzhen Middle SchoolScience Association provides its members with high-qualified academic courses, where deeper level knowledge is offered.

Torchlight 
Torchlight is a club which provides its members with a place to communicate with each other. It is mainly used for discussions about politics.

Notable alumni
Ma Huateng, Chairman of Tencent Holdings Limited
Chen Yidan, co-founder and former CAO of Tencent Holdings Limited
Han Jiarui, Gold Medalist in the 38th International Mathematical Olympiad
Mingyu Xue, Gold Medalist in the 36th International Chemistry Olympiad
Jiayin Kang, Gold Medalist in the 46th International Math Olympiad
Zeng Yi, Gold Medalist in the 38th International Chemistry Olympiad
Chaoming Jiani, Gold Medalist in the 38th International Physics Olympiad
Luo Yuhao, Fashion Designer of Nicole Farhi

References

Media citations
SZ Middle School partners with German institute 
Mission San Jose High School Delegation visited Shenzhen Middle School in April 2007

External links

Shenzhen Middle School

1947 establishments in China
Educational institutions established in 1947
High schools in Shenzhen
Luohu District
Schools in China